Katie Hayward (born 23 July 2000) is an Australian racewalker.  She represented Australia at the 2019 World Athletics Championships held in Doha, Qatar and also at the 2020 Summer Olympics held in Tokyo, Japan. At the 2020 Olympics, she came 37th in the women's 20km walk final with a time of 1:38.11, just on 9 minutes behind the eventual winner Antonella Palmisano.

Early years 
Hayward joined Gold Coast Little Athletics at the age of 10. She was always very active  and did a range of sports, including nippers, surf lifesaving, dancing, soccer and touch football. At Little Athletics she participated in a walking race and won. As she got older Hayward regularly broke high quality national records, particularly the U18 5000m and U20 10,000m.

In May 2018, Hayward made her international debut in the under-20 race at the World Race Walking Cup in China. Unfortunately she was disqualified. After reviewing this performance Hayward and her coach changed her technique and at the World Juniors/U20s she came fifth. This was Australia's best place in the event for 10 years.

Career 

In June 2019, she won the silver medal in the women's 10,000 metres walk at the Oceania Athletics Championships held in Townsville, Australia. The following month, she won the gold medal in the women's 20 kilometres walk event at the Summer Universiade held in Naples, Italy. In the same year, she also competed in the women's 20 kilometres walk event at the World Athletics Championships held in Doha, Qatar.

In 2018, she competed in the women's 10,000 metres walk at the IAAF World U20 Championships held in Tampere, Finland. She finished in 5th place with a personal best of 45:10.42, and qualified for 2020 Summer Olympics in Tokyo, Japan.

Personal life 

She studies at Griffith University.

Achievements

References

External links 
 

Living people
2000 births
Place of birth missing (living people)
Australian female racewalkers
World Athletics Championships athletes for Australia
Universiade medalists in athletics (track and field)
Universiade gold medalists for Australia
Medalists at the 2019 Summer Universiade
Olympic athletes of Australia
Athletes (track and field) at the 2020 Summer Olympics
21st-century Australian women